Cawkwell is a hamlet and former civil parish in the East Lindsey district of Lincolnshire, England. It is in the civil parish of Scamblesby.

Cawkwell is a deserted medieval village first mentioned in 1354.
Cawkwell parish church was dedicated to Saint Peter. It was still standing in 1872 but had disappeared by 1924, with parts of it used to restore the church at Scamblesby. Cawkwell House is a Grade II listed building dating from 1825 and built of brick with a slate roof.

References

External links
"Cawkwell (Calkwell)", Genuki.org.uk. Retrieved 9 April 2013

Villages in Lincolnshire
East Lindsey District
Former civil parishes in Lincolnshire